All Alone in the Universe is a children's novel by American author Lynne Rae Perkins. It was first published in 1999. It is about a young middle school girl named Debbie and the hardships she faces as her best friend, Maureen, is "stolen" from her by a classmate, Glenna.

All Alone in the Universe was Lynne Rae Perkins' first published novel. Her other works include the picture books The Broken Cat and Snow Music and the Newbery Medal-winning novel, Criss Cross.

Plot summary
The book begins with Debbie and Maureen being best friends, and everything is going fine, but then Glenna Flaiber begins to join in on their friendship activities, and soon Debbie realizes that Maureen is ignoring her. Debbie decides that a third person in her plans is not allowed in their plans, in her power to fix her relationship with Maureen she gave her a green-lime bunny that she won in a game but Maureen only said [ohh.......thank you so much Debbie], but the book ends with a real bang. It does not work out. In the end, Maureen and Glenna are inseparable and Debbie became angry and at times sad and is, so to speak, "all alone in the universe"''.

References

External links
 Lynne Rae Perkins' Official website
 A list of Lynne Rae Perkins' novels

1999 American novels
 American children's novels
1999 children's books
 Novels about friendship